The following is a list of all political parties in the Canadian province of Quebec.

Parties represented in the National Assembly

Other registered parties
Other parties authorized by the Director-General of Elections:

Unregistered parties
 Gauche Socialiste (never registered)

Historical parties that won seats in the National or Legislative Assembly
 Action démocratique du Québec 1994–2012
 Action libérale nationale 1934–c. 1939
 Bloc Populaire Canadien 1943–1949
 Ligue nationaliste canadienne 1908–1916
 Fédération du Commonwealth Coopératif (CCF) 1939–1955
 Parti ouvrier 1890–1931
 Parti conservateur du Québec 1850–1935
 Parti égalité/Equality Party 1990–2013
 Parti créditiste or Ralliement créditiste du Québec 1970–1990 (various names)
 Parti national populaire 1975–1979
 Union Nationale 1935–1989 (known as Unité-Québec 1971–1973)

Pre-Confederation 
 Parti britannique
 Parti bureaucrate
 Parti bleu
 Parti canadien
 Parti patriote
 Parti rouge
 Parti tory

Other historical parties that held seats in the National or Legislative Assembly 
 Parti nationaliste chrétien 1968–1969
 Les Démocrates 1978–1979
 Parti démocrate créditiste 1980
 Option nationale 2011–2017

Other historical parties that nominated candidates
 Parti communiste du Québec 1921–2002
 Parti ouvrier-progressiste 1943–1959
 Union des électeurs 1944–1948
 Parti social-démocratique 1955–1959
 Parti républicain du Québec 1962–1964
 Parti socialiste du Québec 1963–1968
 Nouveau Parti démocratique du Québec 1963–1994
 Rassemblement pour l'indépendance nationale 1964–1968
 Ralliement national 1965–1968
 Parti Rhinocéros 1968–1993
 Groupe socialiste des travailleurs 1973–1987
 Parti présidentiel 1974–1975
 Regroupement des militants syndicaux 1974–1981
 Alliance démocratique 1976–1977
 Parti crédit social uni 1979–1994
 Parti démocrate créditiste 1980
 Parti équitable 2012–2019
 Parti progressiste conservateur du Québec 1982–1991
 Parti pour la république du Canada (Québec) 1983–1998 (various names)
 Parti indépendantiste 1985–1990
 Parti du socialisme chrétien 1985
 Parti 51 1980s
 Parti citron 1989–1994
 Parti unité/Unity Party 1989–1990
 Parti économique du Québec 1993–1998
 Parti innovateur du Québec 1993–2003
 Parti de la souveraineté du Québec 1993–1996
 CANADA! 1994–1998
 Parti de la démocratie socialiste 1994–2002
 Parti de la loi naturelle du Québec 1994–2003
 Développement Québec 1994–1996
 Rassemblement pour l'alternative progressiste 2000–2002
 Union des forces progressistes 2002–2006
 Parti communiste du Québec 2006–2012
 Parti république du Québec 2007–2009
 Parti unité nationale (formerly Parti démocratie chrétienne du Québec) 2002–2018
 Parti indépendantiste 2007–2017
 Citoyens au pouvoir du Québec 2011–2021
 Changement Intégrité pour notre Québec 2016–2020
 Parti travailliste du Québec (founded 2015)

Historical parties that never nominated candidates 
 AffiliationQuebec (2008–2012)
 Union du centre (2008–2010)
 Option Canada (1991–1993) (never officially registered)

Municipal parties

Montreal 

Civic Action League 1951–1961
Civic Party of Montreal 1960–1994
Montreal Citizens' Movement 1973–2001
Union Montreal 2001–2013
Vision Montreal 1994–2014
Projet Montréal 2004–
Équipe Denis Coderre 2013–
Coalition Montréal 2013–
Vrai changement pour Montréal 2013–
Mouvement Montréal 2021 -

Quebec City 
Quebec Civic Action
Quebec Municipal Renewal
Vision Quebec

See also
Chief Electoral Officer of Quebec

External links
 National Assembly list of current and historical political parties

References

 
Parties
Quebec